The 2007 United States Virgin Islands Constitutional Convention election was an election to the Fifth Constitutional Convention of the U.S. Virgin Islands in the United States Virgin Islands on 12 June 2007. The convention was the fifth attempt to give the United States territory its own constitution; previous constitutional conventions had been elected (without a constitution being adopted) in 1964, 1971, 1977 and 1980. 

There were thirty delegates elected — fifteen from Saint Croix, twelve from Saint Thomas, and three from Saint John. Two delegates from each of those districts were elected by voters on a territory-wide basis.

Election results

Process
The delegates had until May 31, 2009 to deliberate on a constitution proposal. The convention did not start work in July 2007, as planned, due to delays over legal challenges to the poll; it finally convened on 29 October 2007. 

It was then to be (after review periods by the Governor of the United States Virgin Islands, the President of the United States and the United States Congress) be put to a referendum, possibly in November 2010.  However, Congress referred the proposed constitution back to the Virgin Islands for further deliberations.  The convention was then reconvened, with a deadline to act before the end of October, 2012.

This deadline passed, so for the time being the people of the Virgin Islands will continue to be governed by the Revised Organic Act of 1954, an enactment of the United States Congress. It is a federal law, meaning the people of the Virgin Islands cannot amend it themselves.

References

External links
 Election results
 Constitutional Conventions in the United States Virgin Islands
 Official timeline of the Fifth Constitutional Convention
 Information and stories about the Fifth Constitutional Convention from former Virgin Islands Daily News reporter Megan Poinski

2007 United States Virgin Islands elections
2007 elections in the Caribbean
Elections in the United States Virgin Islands
June 2007 events in North America